Iain Fraoch MacDonald (died 1368) was a younger son of Angus Og MacDonald of Islay, and founder of Clan MacDonald of Glencoe.

"Fraoch" is a nickname which means "the snarling" in the Scottish Gaelic language, although it usually means heather

External links
entry from peerage website

1368 deaths
Iain Fraoch
Medieval Gaels from Scotland
14th-century Scottish people
Year of birth unknown